Turkish Immigration can refer to:
 First Turkic migration to Rumelia or Balkans that took place under Byzantine Empire before 1360
 Population exchange between Greece and Turkey in 1923 following the Treaty of Lausanne of 1922
 Russo-Turkish War immigrations
 The immigration of Turks in Bulgaria to Turkey during the Cold War
 Modern-day Turkish diaspora